Osh-Avia was a charter airline based in Osh (Osh Airport) in Kyrgyzstan.

The airline was on the air carriers banned in the European Union.

Services 
Services operated by Osh-Avia included the following destinations:

Bishkek (Manas International Airport)
Osh (Osh Airport).

References 

Defunct airlines of Kyrgyzstan
Airlines established in 2006